Vyto Ruginis (born Vytautas Ruginis; April 17, 1956) is an English-American actor and producer. He is best known for playing vampire Russell Winters in the cult TV series Angel in its first episode, "City Of", as well as for his appearances in CSI, House MD, The X-Files, ER, Law & Order, NCIS: Los Angeles and other television programs.

Ruginis was born on April 17, 1956, in Wolverhampton, England to Lithuanian parents and later moved to Chicago, Illinois. On September 12, 2015, Ruginis was inducted into the National Lithuanian American Hall of Fame.

Ruginis has appeared in such films as The Devil's Advocate with Al Pacino and Keanu Reeves, Cliffhanger with Sylvester Stallone, Broken Arrow with John Travolta and Christian Slater, Jumpin' Jack Flash with Whoopi Goldberg, The Fast and The Furious, Auto Focus, and many more.

Filmography
 1986 8 Million Ways to Die as Joe Durkin
 1986 Jumpin' Jack Flash as Carl
 1987 Burglar as K.E. Graybow 
 1987 The Verne Miller Story as Fitzsimmons 
 1987 Made in Heaven as Lyman McCray
 1988 Hot to Trot as Mr. Pandolfi 
 1988 Slipping Into Darkness as Otis
 1989 Casualties of War as The Prosecutor
 1990 Dimenticare Palermo as Ted
 1992 Bad Love as Evan
 1993 Cliffhanger as FBI Agent Mathesen
 1994 Clean Slate as Hendrix
 1995 Last Gasp as Ray Tattinger
 1996 Broken Arrow as Johnson
 1996 Phenomenon as Ted Rhome 
 1997 A Thousand Acres as Charles Carter 
 1997 The Devil's Advocate as Mitch Weaver, Justice Department
 1998 Yakima Wash
 1999 The Secret Life of Girls as Daniel
 1999 Ally McBeal (TV Series) as Mr. Goodman
 1999 Wishmaster 2: Evil Never Dies as Hosticka
 1999 Angel (TV Series) as Russell Winters (Episode: "City Of")
 1999 The Insider as Junior Lawyer 
 2000 Robbers as Dayton
 2001 Private Lies as Bob
 2001 The Fast and the Furious as Harry
 2001 The Glass House as Don
 2002 Auto Focus as Nickie D
 2003 JAG (TV Series) as Agent Dawkins (Episode: "Meltdown")
 2004 The Last Run as Clancy
 2006 Home of the Brave as Hank Yates
 2007 The Gray Man as Detective Maher
 2008 Player 5150 as Governor Elect Lanzelin
 2009-2023 NCIS: Los Angeles (TV Series) as Arkady Kolchek (27 episodes)
 2011 Moneyball as Scout 
 2012 Bad Blood as Sheriff
 2014 Lost Time as Mr. Coffey
 2017 Miracle as Bernardas
 2017 Grand Theft Auto Online: The Doomsday Heist DLC (Videogame) as Bogdan (voice)
 2020 Deputy (TV Series) as King #2 (2 episodes)

References

External links

1956 births
Living people
American male film actors
American male television actors
American people of Lithuanian descent
English male film actors
English male television actors
English people of Lithuanian descent
Male actors from Chicago
People from Wolverhampton
St. Ignatius College Prep alumni